The Maristan of Granada was a bimaristan (hospital) in Granada, Spain. It was built in the 14th century and demolished in the 19th century.

History 

Maristans or bimaristans were the historic equivalent of hospitals in the Islamic world, first originating further east and spreading to Morocco and Al-Andalus around the 12th to 14th centuries. The Maristan of Granada may have been inspired or influenced by similar institutions founded by the Marinids in Morocco (e.g. the 13th-century Maristan of Sidi Fej). It was founded by the Nasrid sultan Muhammad V in 1365, with construction finishing in 1367. It was located in the lower Albaicin quarter, on the north bank of the Darro River near the 11th-century bathhouse known as the Hammam al-Yawza (today known as El Bañuelo). Like other maristans in the region, it was especially notable for treating mental illness, though its original medical focus may have been more general and only slowly became specialized as an asylum for the mentally ill. It was one of the earliest hospitals in Europe that took care of the mentally ill, with comparable institutions in Christian Spain only appearing in the early 15th century with the foundation of the Hospital of Our Lady Mary of the Innocents in Valencia, the first purely psychiatric hospital in Europe.

After the end of Muslim rule in Granada and Spain in the late 15th century, the building was converted to other uses. In the 16th century it became a mint (Casa de la Moneda). By the 19th century the building was in ruins, and was eventually demolished almost entirely in 1843, with further final demolitions taking place in 1984. After the demolition, the maristan's stone lion fountains were moved to the Partal Palace at the nearby Alhambra, where they remained for decades until they were restored and moved again to the Alhambra Museum, where they are now on display along with the maristan's foundation inscription. There have been recent proposals to turn the site of the maristan into an archaeological park.

Architecture 
The layout and shape of the building is known thanks to 19th-century plans and drawings made by Francisco Enríquez Ferrer and Jules Gailhabaud, as well as thanks to modern archeological investigations. Many of its elements had similarities to the Nasrid-era caravanserai known today as the Corral del Carbón.

The structure had a rectangular floor plan measuring 38 by 26.5 meters and was built out of brick and covered with plaster. It consisted of a central courtyard with four long rectangular halls situated along the sides, which were in turn divided in many small rooms and four square halls at the corners with stairs leading to a second level with similar arrangement. The courtyard measured 26 by 15 meters and was surrounded by a portico or gallery. At the center of the courtyard was a long rectangular pool with two lion-shaped stone fountains standing on its longer sides. While central pools were a regular feature of Moorish architecture at this time, the presence of stairs descending into the pool suggests it may have been used for therapeutic bathing. Judging by fragments excavated on site, the interior of the building was once decorated with tilework, carved stucco, and marble. The stone lions, now kept at the Alhambra Museum, are made of dark coloured marble and represent a stylized rather than realistic image of lions.

The building's exterior had a symmetrical façade with a richly-decorated entrance portal. Above the wooden double doors was a decorative ensemble, starting at the bottom with a lintel covered in geometric ornamentation carved in brick, above which was a pointed horseshoe arch-shaped niche which was in turn framed by a polylobed arch motif and surrounded by arabesque vegetal motifs. The arched niche was filled with the building's long foundation inscription carved in stone with Arabic letters painted gold on a turquoise background. This inscription stone panel is also kept at the Alhambra Museum today.

See also 

 Emirate of Granada
 Madrasa of Granada
 Moorish architecture

References 

Buildings and structures in Granada
Buildings and structures completed in the 14th century
Nasrid architecture
Demolished buildings and structures in Spain
Buildings and structures demolished in 1843